Todd Sloan Elik (born April 15, 1966) is a Canadian former professional ice hockey centre who played eight seasons in the National Hockey League (NHL) between 1989 and 1997. After leaving the NHL he spent several years in Europe, retiring in 2008.

Biography

Elik grew up in Bolton, Ontario and played Midget hockey with the St. Michael's Midgets. He was granted a walk-on try out with the OHL's Kingston Canadians in 1983 and made the club.

Elik played three seasons in the Ontario Hockey League with the Kingston Canadians and North Bay Centennials before turning professional.  He made his pro debut with the International Hockey League's Colorado Rangers, and he scored 100 points (44 goals and 56 assists) in his first season.

Elik made his NHL debut with the Kings in the 1989–90 season.  In a season and a half with the Kings, Elik scored 31 goals and added 60 assists.  The Minnesota North Stars acquired Elik before the 1991–92 season, giving up Randy Gilhen, Jim Thomson, and a fourth-round draft pick (which became Alexei Zhitnik) for him.

After a season and a half with Minnesota, Elik joined the Edmonton Oilers.  After playing in 18 games with the Oilers, Elik was placed on waivers and claimed by the San Jose Sharks.  In the 1993–94 season, he scored 25 goals and added 41 assists for the Sharks.
 
After a brief stint with the St. Louis Blues and two seasons with the Boston Bruins organization, Elik left North America to play professionally in Europe. He played for seven seasons in Switzerland's Nationalliga A and, in the 2005–06, 2006–2007 seasons, he went to Austria to play for Innsbruck EV. On December 13, 2007, Elik signed to play for HDD Olimpija Ljubljana, a Slovenian team playing in the Erste Bank Hockey League. He is signed to play for Tilia Olimpija also in 2008–09. He joined on 30 January 2009 from Slovenian capital city Ljubljana club HDD Olimpija Ljubljana of the Erste Bank Hockey League to SCL Tigers.

Elik appeared in 448 NHL games in his career, scoring 111 goals and adding 218 assists.  He also appeared in 52 Stanley Cup playoff games, scoring 15 goals and recording 27 assists.

Career statistics

Regular season and playoffs

References
 

1966 births
Living people
ATSE Graz players
Boston Bruins players
Canadian expatriate ice hockey players in Slovenia
Canadian expatriate ice hockey players in Switzerland
Canadian ice hockey centres
Colorado Rangers players
Denver Rangers players
Edmonton Oilers players
HC Davos players
HC Lugano players
HDD Olimpija Ljubljana players
HC Thurgau players
HC TWK Innsbruck players
HK Acroni Jesenice players
EV Zug players
Kingston Canadians players
Los Angeles Kings players
Minnesota North Stars players
New Haven Nighthawks players
North Bay Centennials players
Sportspeople from Brampton
Providence Bruins players
San Jose Sharks players
SC Langenthal players
SCL Tigers players
St. Louis Blues players
Undrafted National Hockey League players